Revised Romanization of Korean is the official Korean language romanization system in South Korea. It was developed by the National Academy of the Korean Language from 1995 and was released to the public on 7 July 2000 by South Korea's Ministry of Culture and Tourism in Proclamation No. 2000-8.

The new system addressed problems in the implementation of the McCune–Reischauer system, such as the phenomena where different consonants and vowels became indistinguishable in the absence of special symbols. To be specific, under the McCune–Reischauer system, Korean consonants  (k),  (t),  (p) and  (ch) and  (kʼ),  (tʼ),  (pʼ) and  (chʼ) became indistinguishable when the apostrophe was removed. In addition, Korean vowels  (ŏ) and  (o), as well as  (ŭ) and  (u), became indistinguishable when the breve was removed. Especially in internet use, where omission of apostrophes and breves is common, this caused many Koreans as well as foreigners confusion. Hence, the revision was made with the belief that if McCune–Reischauer was left unrevised, it would continue to confuse people, both Koreans and foreigners.

Features

These are notable features of the Revised Romanization system:
 The aspiration distinction between consonants is represented in a new way. The unaspirated consonants     are represented as ⟨g⟩ ⟨d⟩ ⟨b⟩ ⟨j⟩ respectively and the aspirated consonants     are represented as ⟨k⟩ ⟨t⟩ ⟨p⟩ ⟨ch⟩. These letter pairs have a similar aspiration distinction in English at the beginning of a syllable (though they also have a voicing distinction unlike Korean); this approach is also used by Hanyu Pinyin. By contrast, the McCune–Reischauer system uses ⟨k⟩ ⟨t⟩ ⟨p⟩ ⟨ch⟩ both for the unaspirated and aspirated consonants, adding an apostrophe for the aspirated versions (⟨kʼ⟩ ⟨tʼ⟩ ⟨pʼ⟩ ⟨chʼ⟩). (The McCune–Reischauer system also includes voicing, which the revised romanization does not.)
 However,     are not always romanized as ⟨g⟩ ⟨d⟩ ⟨b⟩ ⟨j⟩, depending on their environment. For example, they are romanized as ⟨k⟩ ⟨t⟩ ⟨p⟩ ⟨ch⟩ when placed in the final position, as they are neutralized to unreleased stops:   → byeok,   → bak,   → bueok,   → byeoge,   → bakke,   → bueoke,   → keop.
 ㅅ used to be written as sh and s, depending on context. Now it will be written as s in all cases.
   is written as ⟨s⟩ regardless of the following vowels and semivowels; there is no ⟨sh⟩:   → sa,   → si.
 When followed by another consonant or when in final position, it is written as ⟨t⟩:   → ot (but   → ose).
   is ⟨r⟩ before a vowel or a semivowel and ⟨l⟩ everywhere else:   → rieul,   → Cheorwon,   → Ulleungdo,   → Balhae. Like in McCune–Reischauer,   is written ⟨l⟩ whenever pronounced as a lateral rather than as a nasal consonant:   → Jeollabuk-do

In addition, special provisions are for regular phonological rules in exceptions to transliteration (see Korean phonology).

Other rules and recommendations include the following:

 A hyphen optionally disambiguates syllables:  → ga-eul (fall; autumn) versus  → gae-ul (stream). However, few official publications make use of this provision since actual instances of ambiguity among names are rare.
 A hyphen must be used in linguistic transliterations to denote syllable-initial  except at the beginning of a word:  → eobs-eoss-seumnida,  → oegug-eo,  → Ae-ogae
 It is permitted to hyphenate syllables in the given name, following common practice. Certain phonological changes, ordinarily indicated in other contexts, are ignored in names, for better disambiguating between names:  → Gang Hongrip or Gang Hong-rip (not *Hongnip),  → Han Boknam or Han Bok-nam (not *Bongnam or "Bong-nam")
 Administrative units (such as the do) are hyphenated from the placename proper:  → Gangwon-do
 One may omit terms such as :  → Pyeongchang-gun or Pyeongchang,  → Pyeongchang-eup or Pyeongchang.
 However, names for geographic features and artificial structures are not hyphenated:  → Seoraksan,  → Haeinsa
 Proper nouns are capitalized.

Usage

In South Korea

Almost all road signs, names of railway and subway stations on line maps and signs, etc. have been changed according to Revised Romanization of Korean (RR, also called South Korean or Ministry of Culture (MC) 2000). It is estimated to have cost at least 500 billion won to 600 billion won (US$500~600 million) to carry out this procedure. All Korean textbooks, maps and signs to do with cultural heritage were required to comply with the new system by 28 February 2002. Romanization of surnames and existing companies' names has been left untouched because of the reasons explained below. However, the Korean government encourages using the revised romanization of Korean for the new names.

Exceptions
Like several European languages that have undergone spelling reforms (such as Portuguese, German or Swedish), the Revised Romanization is not expected to be adopted as the official romanization of Korean family names (example I, Bak, Gim, Choe instead of Lee, Park, Kim, Choi which are used commonly). This is because the conditions for allowing changes in romanization of surnames in passport is very strict. The reasons are outlined below.

 Countries around the world manage information about foreigners who are harmful to the public safety of their countries, including international criminals and illegal immigrants by the Roman name and date of birth of the passport they have used in the past. If a passport holder is free to change their listed Roman name, it would pose a serious risk to border management due to difficulty in determining identities.
 The people of a country where it is free to change the official Roman name will be subject to strict immigration checks, which will inevitably cause inconvenience to the people of that country.
 Arbitrary changes in the romanization of passports can lead to a fall in the credibility of the passports and national credit, which can have a negative impact on new visa waiver agreements, etc.

With very few exceptions, it is impossible for a person who has ever left the country under their romanized name to change their family name again. However, South Korea's Ministry of Culture, Sports and Tourism encourages those who “newly” register their romanized names to follow the Revised Romanization of Korean. In addition, North Korea continues to use a version of the McCune–Reischauer system of romanization, a different version of which was in official use in South Korea from 1984 to 2000.

Transcription rules

Vowel letters

Consonant letters

Special provisions
The revised romanization transcribes certain phonetic changes that occur with combinations of the ending consonant of a character and the initial consonant of the next like Hanguk → Hangugeo. These significant changes occur (highlighted in yellow):

Phonetic changes between syllables in given names are not transcribed:  → Jeong Seokmin or Jeong Seok-min,  → Choe Bitna or Choe Bit-na.

However, aspirated sounds are not reflected in case of nouns where  follows ,  and :  → Mukho,  → Jiphyeonjeon.

See also
 Romanization of Korean
 Korean Pronunciation, Help:IPA/Korean

References

External links

Romanization of Korean from the National Institute of Korean Language
Korean Romanization Converter by Pusan National University
software online: lexilogos words' converter Hangul to Latin alphabet
Culture Ministry sets guideline for Romanizing Korean names

Romanization of Korean
ISO standards
2000 establishments in South Korea
2000 introductions
Standards of South Korea